The Saint Louis Billikens baseball team is a varsity intercollegiate athletic team of Saint Louis University in St. Louis, Missouri, United States. The team is a member of the Atlantic 10 Conference, which is part of the National Collegiate Athletic Association's Division I. The team plays its home games at Billiken Sports Center in St. Louis, Missouri. The Billikens are coached by Darin Hendrickson.

Notable players
Dan Dugan
Bob Habenicht
Joe Murphy
James Norwood
Bradbury Robinson
Harry Sullivan

See also
List of NCAA Division I baseball programs

References

External links